Aveline de Grandpré is a fictional character in Ubisoft's Assassin's Creed video game franchise. She first appears as the protagonist of Assassin's Creed III: Liberation, a spin-off installment originally released for the PlayStation Vita in October 2012. She has also featured in a titular expansion pack for the 2013 title Assassin's Creed IV: Black Flag, which takes place after the ending of Liberation, as well as other spin-off media of the franchise. In both of her video game appearances, she is portrayed by actress Amber Goldfarb through performance capture.

Within the series' alternate historical setting, Aveline is a Louisiana Creole member of the Assassin Brotherhood (a fictional organization inspired by the real-life Order of Assassins) who was active in New Orleans during the French Louisiana era as well as the subsequent Spanish occupation in Louisiana, which took place during the same time period as the French and Indian War (1754–1763) and the subsequent American Revolutionary War (1775–1783). Her primary objectives are to defend abused slaves and fight for their freedom, as well as eliminating members of the Templar Order (inspired by the Knights Templar military order), the Assassins' mortal enemies, whom she encounters during her adventures.

Critical reception towards Aveline has been mostly positive, particularly for her status as a prominent female character of color and her role in the fictionalized depiction of the Atlantic slave trade in the Assassin's Creed series. She is the first female protagonist of the series and is well received as a positive example of ethnic minority representation in video games.

Concept and design

In an interview with Evan Narcisse from Kotaku, Liberation writer Jill Murray explained that Aveline was concepted by developmental staff at Ubisoft Sofia at the beginning of the project, which predated her involvement. She noted that the studio "did their research and decided from the beginning that a woman Assassin of French and Haitian descent would be a compelling character". Along with co-writer Richard Fareze (sic), the formal research they relied on were official documents from the era that directly impacted life for the characters of Liberation, in particular the Code Noir, a French legal document which defined the conditions and rules of slavery in territories under French sovereignty. Murray also read slave narratives from various eras to immerse herself into their experiences and reactions people, along with their use of written language. Murray said she also took inspiration from informal conversations with people, particularly if their own experiences are relevant to the subject matter she explores as part of her work.

In response to a line of questioning from Narcisse as to whether it was a conscious decision or a coincidence that Aveline's character arc incorporated tropes such as the "tragic mulatto", "slave revenge" and the "Back-to-Africa movement", Murray indicated that her approach to text, as informed by her work background in theatre production, is with an eye for how to bring worlds and characters to life, rather than critical analysis for its own sake from an English or cultural studies perspective. Murray explained that Aveline's arc should not be interpreted as an attempt to reflect the entirety of the 18th century black experience as she is "an individual, not a people or an issue". Thus, Murray and her co-writer would look for other opportunities to represent different points of view through the characters Aveline meets, who are depicted as an array of individuals attempting to survive and carve out their own destinies in diverse ways. For example, the backstory of Aveline's mother Jeanne, from her abduction into a life of slavery and becoming the placée of Aveline's French father Philippe Olivier de Grandpré, is recounted in a series of diary entries which Aveline could collect in the game world. Aveline also meets a man who has no territory he feels he can call home, and comes into conflict with a former slave who has opted to fight for the English as a soldier in exchange for his freedom.

With regards to Aveline's presentation as a female protagonist in the Assassin's Creed franchise, Murray noted that it has not changed how the game itself is presented, though the actual game mechanics introduced "some fresh energy and some new opportunities" into the game's design. Murray was of the view that it is necessary to rebut incorrect assumptions and misconceptions about the perceived risks involving the creation and inclusion characters from minority groups, noting that writers should have to rise to the occasion if they believe in their characters, and show themselves and people they work with how to portray them successfully. She emphasized that "this does not require magic, scary effort—it's effort anyone can put in. It's fun, it adds variety, and it makes a lot of players feel good."

Aveline has access to three personas in Liberation: besides her well-armed Assassin persona, she also has the "lady" persona, a respectable businesswoman who is following in her father's footsteps, and a "slave" persona where she is able to blend in among black slaves who have similar backgrounds as her mother. Each persona is more than a change in physical attire as she exhibits different abilities, and alters the way she interacts with her environment as well as how characters respond to her; guards will attempt to protect her from danger when Aveline assumes her "lady" persona, whereas they will react with hostility if she is encountered as an Assassin. Murray suggested that with each persona, Aveline attempts to see where within the society of New Orleans she fits, and that she truly becomes herself whenever she assumes the Assassin persona, as it is a combination of every aspect of her identity which she grows into and comes to inhabit. 

Weapons employed by Aveline include dueling pistols, a cane knife, a whip she appropriates from a slave master at a predetermined point in the narrative of Liberation, poison darts fired from a blowgun or a modified parasol, and the Assassins' signature Hidden Blade. Many of Aveline's in-game movements for Liberation were taken directly from those designed for Connor and Haytham Kenway, the two playable characters of Assassin's Creed III; only a handful of her animations, such as walking and running, were replaced.

Appearances

Assassin's Creed III: Liberation
Aveline is an ancestor of "Subject 1", the first participant of the experimental phase of the Animus Project conducted by Abstergo Industries, a corporate front of the Templar Order in the modern era. The story of Liberation is presented as a story within a story in the form of a video game created by Abstergo using the genetic memories of Subject 1. Aveline was born in 1747 to Philippe Olivier de Grandpré, a French merchant, and his African placée, Jeanne, whom Philippe had freed from slavery. In 1752, Phillippe married Madeleine de L'Isle, the daughter of a wealthy merchant, to alleviate his financial troubles, which strained his relationship with Jeanne. Eventually, sometime in Aveline's youth, Jeanne disappeared from both her and Philippe's lives without explanation, leaving Aveline to be raised by her father and Madeleine in their family mansion in New Orleans.

Later in life, Aveline committed herself to freeing oppressed slaves, and met Agaté, the mentor of the Louisiana branch of the Colonial Brotherhood of Assassins, who operated out of the bayou surrounding New Orleans. Impressed by her devotion to freedom and justice, Agaté inducted Aveline into the Brotherhood along with her childhood friend and the accountant of her family business, Gérald Blanc. He trained them to be his agents in New Orleans to counter the Templar Order's activities, with Aveline handling field work and Gérald operating an information network within the city. After the Templars' presence in the bayou notably increased by 1766, Agaté went further into hiding deep within the swamp. Due to Aveline's natural impulsiveness and disinclination to follow orders, as well as her resentment of the secretive nature of Agaté's dealings with her and Gérald, Agaté frequently clashed with her and eventually began to doubt her loyalty to the Assassin cause.

Aveline's mission to dismantle the slave trade in New Orleans eventually leads her to cross paths with a number of Templars and their allies whom she assassinates, including a fictionalized version of French governor Jean-Jacques Blaise d'Abbadie, and Baptiste, an Assassin turncoat and former friend of Agaté impersonating their late mentor, François Mackandal. During this time, Aveline uncovers a Templar plot orchestrated by Rafael Joaquín de Ferrer to take full control of New Orleans following its transition to Spanish rule at the end of the French and Indian War. Aveline deposes de Ferrer's associate, Antonio de Ulloa, who was appointed Louisiana's first Spanish governor, but chooses to spare his life after he informs her of a labor camp of seemingly liberated slaves in Chichen Itza overseen by de Ferrer. This strains her relationship with Agaté, who ordered her to kill Ulloa, which is futher damaged after Aveline again disobeys her mentor and decides to infiltrate de Ferrer's camp.

At the camp, Aveline discovers de Ferrer is working for a Templar higher-up known only by the pseudonym of the "Company Man", who ordered him to use the slaves to excavate the Maya ruins and find a temple built by the lost Precursor race. While searching for the temple herself, Aveline unexpectedly reunites with her mother Jeanne and learns she is a former Assassin who was forced to leave New Orleans after stealing an artifact from the Brotherhood—a locket she gifted to Aveline in her youth. With Jeanne's help, Aveline beats de Ferrer to the temple, where she retrieves one half of a Precursor artifact called the Prophecy Disk and kills de Ferrer. On her second visit to Chichen Itza in 1772, Aveline forgives her mother for abandoning her and, after helping her daughter retrieve the second half of the Disk, Jeanne decides to stay in Chichen Itza to prevent the Templars from uncovering more Precursor sites.

In 1776, Aveline assassinates a Templar named Diego Vázquez, who had been attempting to take control of the Louisiana bayou, but her father passes away, allowing Madeleine to assume control of his estate, though the family business remains in Gérald's name. In 1777, Aveline travels to New York to hunt down a Loyalist Officer who has information on the identity of the Company Man. With the help of fellow Assassin Connor (the protagonist of Assassin's Creed III), Aveline assassinates her target, revealed to be George Davidson, a former slave she had liberated on her stepmother's instigation and passed into the care of the Patriots. With this information in mind, as well as what she learned from her mother, Aveline is able to piece together that the Company Man is none other than Madeleine, and confronts her stepmother on her return to New Orleans. Madeleine admits to being responsible for Philippe's death and Jeanne's abandonment years ago, and reveals that she had been secretly grooming Aveline to become a Templar since her childhood, asking her to kill Agaté as a final show of trust. 

Aveline goes to warn Agaté, but her former mentor, paranoid and believing that his pupil has betrayed the Assassins because of her past disobeyances, attacks her. After being defeated, Agaté, unable to reconcile with the fact that he failed both Aveline and Jeanne (whom he secretly loved), commits suicide. Aveline uses Agaté's death to deceive Madeleine into believing that she genuinely intends to pledge herself and the Prophecy Disk to the Templar Order. At the St. Louis Cathedral, Aveline kills Madeleine and her remaining followers, thus finally ridding New Orleans of Templar influence, before connecting her locket to the Disk to unlock a secret message from the Precursor era.

Other appearances 
The Aveline expansion pack for Assassin's Creed IV: Black Flag follows Aveline seven years after the events of Liberation. In 1784, Aveline, at Connor's behest, travels to Rhode Island to find an escaped slave, Patience Gibbs, and recruit her to the Assassins. Upon arrival, she learns that Patience possesses a charm—a Piece of Eden—which is sought by a Templar doctor, Edmund Judge. Although Aveline rescues Patience from the Templars, she refuses to join her and attempts to escape on her own, only to be quickly re-captured by Judge, who forces her to hand over the charm. Patience teams up with Aveline to recover it, and the two women ultimately confront and kill Judge, who was unable to unlock the charm's power. Patience then reveals that she managed to keep an essential component of the charm, without which it is useless, and accepts Aveline's invite to join the Assassins.

Aveline was also featured as part of Assassin's Creed: Initiates, a discontinued community-oriented social application website operated by Ubisoft which was active from August 2012 to December 2015. The character's outfit is an unlockable cosmetic option for Evie Frye, one of the two protagonists of the 2015 game Assassin's Creed Syndicate.

Promotion and merchandise
Like other protagonists in the series, Aveline has been subject to merchandise. A promotional video featuring a limited edition figurine of Aveline was uploaded to Ubisoft's official YouTube account in November 15, 2018. Aveline's likeness, along with five other series protagonists, was used for a line of character-themed wine labels as part of a joint collaboration between Ubisoft and winemaker Lot18; the full name of her label is "2017 Aveline de Grandpré Appellation Côtes du Rhône Contrôlée".

Reception
As a character, Aveline has been mostly well received. She is considered to be one of the most notable black characters in video game history. Evan Narcisse from Kotaku wrote positively of the character on more than one occasion, and believed that she is a "great black game character". He was intrigued by the idea of Aveline because of her ethnic background and that it is uncommon for a character like her to be in the leading role of a major video game. In an article published for Kotaku in February 2013, Narcisse considered Liberation to be the "best example of how to craft a character descended from African heritage in a video game", as it takes a historical moment where the action happens and finds ways to integrate the experience of being a mixed-race woman in 18th Century New Orleans into an interesting playable adventure. Conversely, Narcisse expressed disappointment that Aveline was voiced by a white actress, and contrasted the decision to the casting of an actor who has Blackfoot heritage for Connor, a character of Native American descent.

Chris Suellentrop from The New York Times suggested that Aveline may have been "the greatest black heroine in the history of video games" in an article dated January 2014, and that she is deserving of a wider audience which he believed the early 2014 release of the high-definition makeover of Liberation for platforms far more popular than the PlayStation Vita should provide. Suellentrop commented that while neither the original version of Liberation nor the remastered version were very good, with aspects such as gameplay, storytelling and voice acting being of questionable quality at best, he has yet to encounter a game which deals with the history and imagery of slavery in the New World in intimate detail through Aveline's story arc, and that the game demonstrates a level of sensitivity and intelligence in its approach. Mike Williams from US Gamer agreed that Liberation is a flawed game, though he enjoyed the exploration of Aveline's role in New Orleans as an assassin and as the free daughter of a former slave, and expressed hope that the remastered version of the game would enjoy a new, wider audience. Jef Rouner from Houston Press noted that Aveline was discussed extensively during the controversy surrounding gender options for the cooperative mode of Assassin's Creed Unity in 2014, with some quarters labeling her an inferior series protagonist as the original version of Liberation was perceived to be a portable spin-off which lacked the distinctive gameplay of the mainline console entries, though Rouner emphasized that she is still "pretty badass". On the other hand, Tobias Kraft criticized Aveline's characterization in his chapter of the book New Orleans and the Global South: Caribbean, Creolization, Carnival as "shallow" and that her motivations never goes beyond the "obvious trail" of heroic solidarity and individual sacrifice, and said that she falls short of the standards set by Jean Genet's Les Negres".

The Guardian staff included her in their list of "30 truly interesting female game characters", commenting that her ability to change her appearance in order to alter how other characters treat her is apt for the nature of her position as the series' first female protagonist, and noted that while Ubisoft may have received criticism for its attitude towards female characters, she was never reduced into being a mere love interest to Connor at the very least. Aveline placed favorably on PC Gamer ranking list of Assassin's Creed series protagonists, with Andy Kelly calling her "infinitely more interesting than boring old Connor".

Analysis
In a 2015 discussion panel titled "The Visual Politics of Play: On the Signifying Practices of Digital Games", Professor Anna Everett took the view that Ubisoft's decision to feature Aveline as a lead character of a major video game franchise, while commendable, is undermined by the fact that Liberation is set in the colonial period of slavery which is "overdetermined in both its willingness to address this ignoble past and, arguably, its unwillingness to craft a powerful contemporary black shero tackling racial justice issues in the 21st century". The panel's chair, Professor Soraya Murray, devoted the first chapter of her 2017 book On Video Games: The Visual Politics of Race, Gender and Space to analyze Aveline's role within the narrative of Liberation and the franchise as a whole. Jagger Gravning from The Atlantic analyzed Aveline's choice of clothing, dialogue and mannerisms in Liberation as well the eponymous Black Flag DLC, and concluded that her gender identity or sexual orientation is ambiguous and may be open to interpretation.

See also
History of New Orleans

References

Further reading

Action-adventure game characters
Assassin's Creed characters
Black characters in video games
Female characters in video games
Fictional businesspeople in video games
Fictional characters from New Orleans
Fictional explorers in video games
Fictional female assassins
Fictional female businesspeople
Fictional female swordfighters
Fictional female gunfighters
Fictional French people in video games
Fictional knife-fighters
Fictional people from the 18th-century
Fictional secret agents and spies in video games
Fictional swordfighters in video games
Fictional traceurs and freerunners
Video game characters introduced in 2012
Video game protagonists
Vigilante characters in video games
Woman soldier and warrior characters in video games
Fictional musketeers and pistoleers